Marcus Højriis Ingvartsen (born 4 January 1996) is a Danish professional footballer who plays as a forward for Bundesliga club Mainz 05 and the Denmark national team.

Club career

Nordsjælland
Ingvartsen started his career in his native Denmark for Superliga and hometown side FC Nordsjælland. He finished the 2016–17 Danish Superliga season as the top scorer in the league with 23 league goals; finishing 3 goals ahead of second player on the list, Teemu Pukki. Ingvartsen also won the Young Players of the Year award for that season, as a result of his impressive league performances. He also won the league's player of the month award for both November and April during the season. He went on to score 30 goals in 76 matches for Nordsjælland.

Genk
After his standout season, Belgian club Genk signed Ingvartsen during the summer of 2017. Ingvartsen started his first season with Genk with a few late substitute appearances for them. But in his first full game for Genk, Ingvartsen scored twice against Eupen to earn Genk a 3–3 draw. Ingvartsen scored again in Genk's next league game against Mouscron. Ingvartsen scored more league goals against Kortrijk and Oostende, before suffering a serious knee injury in early 2018 which ended his season. Before his injury, Ingvartsen had played a key role in getting Genk to the final of the Belgian Cup. He equalised against Mechelen in the seventh minute to earn a 1–1 draw and he scored again when the game went to a penalty shoot out, which Genk won. Ingvartsen scored again in Genk's quarter-final penalty shootout win over Waasland-Beveren. In Genk's semi-final match against Kortrijk, Ingvartsen scored the opening goal of the match, which helped Genk reach the final. Genk lost 1–0 to Standard Liège in the final of the Belgian Cup on 17 March 2018.

Ingvartsen was injured at the start of the 2018–19 season and missed the early part of the league campaign. When he returned from injury, he helped Genk win the Belgian First Division league title.

Union Berlin
In June 2019, Ingvartsen signed for newly promoted Bundesliga side Union Berlin on a three-year deal. He made his debut for the club on 11 August in the 0–6 away win over VfB Germania Halberstadt in the second round of the DFB-Pokal.

Mainz 05
On 30 August 2021, after the third matchday of the 2021–22 Bundesliga season, Ingvartsen was sent on loan to league rivals Mainz 05 with a purchase option until the end of the season. In his debut on 11 September, he scored the 2–0 goal in the away game at Hoffenheim one minute after being substituted on. During his loan period with Mainz, Ingvartsen contributed with 6 goals in 664 minutes of playing time in the league.

On 17 May 2022, Mainz made the transfer permanent and Ingvartsen signed a contract until 2025.

International career
Ingvartsen is the all-time leading goalscorer for the Danish U21 national team. He surpassed Peter Møller on the all-time list to reach 17 goals thanks to his goal against the England U-21 national team.

He was called up to the senior Denmark squad in March 2021. He made his debut on 28 March 2021 in a World Cup qualifier against Moldova and scored the last goal in a 8–0 victory.

Career statistics

Club

International
Scores and results list Denmark's goal tally first.

Honours
Genk
 Belgian First Division A: 2018–19
 Belgian Cup runner-up: 2017–18

Individual
 Danish Superliga Player of the Month: November 2016, April 2017
 Danish Young Player of the Year: 2016
 Danish Superliga Top Scorer: 2016–17
 Tipsbladet Player of the Spring: 2017

References

External links
 Profile at the 1. FSV Mainz 05 website 
 
 
 

1996 births
Living people
People from Furesø Municipality
Association football forwards
Danish men's footballers
Denmark under-21 international footballers
Denmark youth international footballers
Danish Superliga players
Belgian Pro League players
Bundesliga players
FC Nordsjælland players
K.R.C. Genk players
1. FC Union Berlin players
1. FSV Mainz 05 players
Danish expatriate men's footballers
Expatriate footballers in Belgium
Expatriate footballers in Germany
Danish expatriate sportspeople in Belgium
Danish expatriate sportspeople in Germany
Denmark international footballers
Sportspeople from the Capital Region of Denmark